G. Ashok is an Indian film director and screenwriter who works predominantly in Telugu cinema. Ashok made his directorial debut Ushodayam (2007) which won him Nandi Award for Best Children's Film Director. He went on to direct films such as Aakasa Ramanna, Pilla Zamindar, Sukumarudu ,Chitrangada, and Bhaagamathie.

Personal life 
G. Ashok was born in Ongole, Andhra Pradesh. He married Vijaya in 2009, and the couple has three children.

Career 
He is a classical dancer and good at 13 various Indian classical dances. T Krishna cast him in Repati Pourulu when he was 6 years old. Later, he worked as a child artist in 15 films. He made his debut as a dance assistant in 1997 and worked for over 300 songs as a choreographer and dance assistant. He has worked under dance masters like DKS Babu, Swarnalatha, Lawrence and Raju Sundaram. He worked for films like Master, Annamayya, Pelli, Osey Ramulamma and Jeans. Director Bala was his roommate when he was in Chennai.

He received a Nandi Award for Best Director for a Children's Film for his directorial debut Ushodayam (2007).

In 2010, he directed Aakasa Ramanna, starring Allari Naresh. In 2011, he directed Pilla Zamindar with Nani and Haripriya on the lead. In 2013, he directed Sukumarudu with Aadi and Nisha Agarwal. He is best known for his work on Bhaagamathie (2018) with Anushka Shetty.

Filmography

References

External links

Living people
People from Ongole
Telugu film directors
Year of birth missing (living people)
Film directors from Andhra Pradesh
21st-century Indian film directors
People from Prakasam district
Indian film directors